Naval Ops: Warship Gunner, released in Japan as  is a vehicle simulation game released in 2003 for the PlayStation 2. It is an entry in the larger Kurogane no Houkou series, which also includes the games Naval Ops: Commander and Naval Ops: Warship Gunner 2.

The game is a one-player simulation of naval combat, in which the player commands an individual ship. In the opening cutscene, a World War II-era destroyer is caught in a dimension-warping vortex and transported to a parallel universe where the technology level is the same (although science-fiction weapons such as rail guns are available), but the world is at war between two main factions, the Empire and the Freedom Forces. The first mission of the game revolves around navigating a destroyer to safety while being bombarded by unidentified ships.  Upon rendezvous with friendly forces, later identified as the Freedom Forces, the crew decides to join them in the war against the Empire.

Gameplay
The player can choose between four nationalities: American, British, Japanese, and German. The choice of nationality affects the available ship types and characteristics of the ship parts which become available to the player throughout the game. The player can also choose to play the Normal mode or the World War II mode. In the World War II mode, technologies available will be mostly consistent with what was available to World War II-era warships. In the Normal mode, more advanced technology is available, including science fiction weapons like lasers and wave guns.

At the beginning of the game, the player is given command of a generic destroyer. As missions are completed, the player earns points and money. The points go toward crew promotions, while the money can be used to purchase ship parts from boat hulls to weapons, armor, and equipment. The money earned can also be used to develop technology in five areas: aircraft, weapons, metallurgy, engines, and electronics. The higher level of money invested in each category makes available more advanced designs.

There are five main categories of ships in this game, along letter-pair identifiers: destroyer (DD), cruiser (CL for Light/CA for Heavy), battleship (BB), aircraft carrier (CV), and battlecarrier (BC). With enough money, players can purchase a pre-built design or design their own.  Pre-built vehicles also may feature parts that cannot be found in the game, so players may purchase pre-built vehicles and then scrap them for parts.

The game progresses through 40 missions through 4 theaters of 10 missions each. The first theater is set around the Mediterranean Sea and the Atlantic Ocean. The second theater is in the Pacific Ocean, the third is in the Indian Ocean, while the fourth is worldwide. Toward the end of each of these theaters is a "boss" level, in which players must sink a "supership".

A heavy emphasis of this game is the ability to customize the ships. Larger guns, faster engines, and greater anti-aircraft capability are all available to existing ships.

There are also two sequel games called Naval Ops: Commander which offers pretty much of the same gameplay, however the battle scenes are fought out in a top down view which makes things a little easier, and a later sequel, Naval Ops: Warship Gunner 2, which returned to Warship Gunner's style of gameplay, but with a new story.

A running gag in the game is that the bosses are called superships despite many of them not actually being ships.

Trivia
 The Supership Habbakuk which is fought during the penultimate stage is based on the real-life Project Habakkuk.
 John Birmingham's Axis of Time Trilogy begins in a manner similar to Warship Gunner's opening scene. However, the Multinational Task Force is transported back to World War II circa 1942 by a science experiment. Also of note is the fact that both the Axis and Allies quickly get word of the vie for "21st" technology. Like Warship Gunner, industrial technology following the modern-day task force's arrival develops at an alarming pace; in a few years time, the Allies develop jet fighters and helicopters not due until almost a half-century later.

The weapons and ships names of the Freedom Forces derive from Scots and Irish Gaelic (Celtic languages),and the enemy forces equipment and vessel names are derived from ancient Icelandic (Norse/Viking).

Sequel and spinoff
Aside from the aforementioned Warship Commander subseries and Naval Ops: Warship Gunner 2, there was also a Gunner spinoff titled Boukoku no Aegis 2035: Warship Gunner released by Koei in 2005, based on the novel and film. This game is not considered part of the overall Kurogane no Houkou series.

References

2003 video games
Koei games
Microcabin games
Naval video games
PlayStation 2 games
PlayStation 2-only games
Video games developed in Japan